The 1951 Campeonato Nacional de Fútbol Profesional was Chilean first tier’s 19th season. Unión Española was the tournament’s champion, winning its second title.

First stage

Scores

Standings

Championship stage

Scores

Standings

Aggregate top standings

Championship play-off

Relegation stage

Scores

Standings

Aggregate bottom standings

Topscorer

References

External links
ANFP 
RSSSF Chile 1951

Primera División de Chile seasons
Primera
Chile